Control-Alt-Delete (often abbreviated to Ctrl+Alt+Del, also known as the "three-finger salute" or "Security Keys") is a computer keyboard command on IBM PC compatible computers, invoked by pressing the Delete key while holding the Control and Alt keys: . The function of the key combination differs depending on the context but it generally interrupts or facilitates interrupting a function. For instance, in pre-boot environment (before an operating system starts) or in DOS, Windows 3.0 and earlier versions of Windows or OS/2, the key combination reboots the computer. Starting with Windows 95, the key combination invokes a task manager or security related component that facilitates ending a Windows session or killing a frozen application.

History 

The soft reboot function via keyboard was originally designed by David Bradley. Bradley, as the chief engineer of the IBM PC project and developer of the machine's ROM-BIOS, had originally used
, but found it was too easy to bump the left side of the keyboard and reboot the computer accidentally.

The feature was originally conceived only as a development feature for internal use and not intended to be used by end users, as it triggered the reboot without warning or further confirmation—it was meant to be used by people writing programs or documentation so that they could reboot their computers without powering them down. Bill Gates (former Microsoft CEO) remembered it as "just something we were using in development and it wouldn't be available elsewhere". The feature, however, was detailed in IBM's technical reference documentation to the original PC and thereby revealed to the general public.

Bradley viewed this work as just one small task out of many: "It was five minutes, 10 minutes of activity, and then I moved on to the next of the 100 things that needed to get done." In a March 2018 email, one of Bradley's co-workers confirmed the command was invented in 1981 in Boca Raton, Florida.

Bradley is also known for his good-natured jab at Gates at the celebration of the 20th anniversary of the IBM PC on August 8, 2001 at The Tech Museum: 
"I have to share the credit. I may have invented it, but I think Bill made it famous."; he quickly added it was a reference to Windows NT logon procedures ("Press Ctrl + Alt + Delete to log on").

During a question and answer presentation on 21 September 2013, Gates said "it was a mistake", referring to the decision to use Ctrl+Alt+Del as the keyboard combination to log into Windows. Gates stated he would have preferred a single button to trigger the same actions, but could not get IBM to add the extra button into the keyboard layout.

BIOS 
By default, when the operating system is running in real mode (or in a pre-boot environment, when no operating system is started yet), this keystroke combination is intercepted by the BIOS. The BIOS reacts by performing a soft reboot (also known as a warm reboot).
Examples of such operating systems include DOS, Windows 3.0 in Standard Mode as well as earlier versions of Windows.

Windows

DOS-based Windows 

In Windows 9x and Windows 3.0 running in 386 Enhanced mode, the keystroke combination is recognized by the Windows keyboard device driver. According to the value of the  option in the  section of system.ini, Windows performs one of several actions in response. If  (default):
 Windows 3.1x displays a blue screen that allows the user to press Enter to end a task that has stopped responding to the system (if such a task exists) or press Control+Alt+Delete again to perform a soft reboot. The text of this rudimentary task manager was written by Steve Ballmer.
 Windows 9x temporarily halts the entire system and displays the Close Program dialog box, a window which lists currently running processes and allows the user to end them (by force, if necessary). The user can press Control+Alt+Delete again to perform a soft reboot.

If , Windows performs a soft reboot.

Windows NT family 

The Windows NT family of operating system, whose members do not have "NT" in their names since Windows 2000, reserve Ctrl+Alt+Delete for the operating system itself. Winlogon, a core component of the operating system, responds to the key combination in the following scenarios:

Invoking Windows Security When a user is logged onto a Windows computer, pressing Ctrl+Alt+Delete invokes Windows Security. It is a graphical user interface that allows user to lock the system, switch user, log off, change the password, invoke Windows Task Manager, or end the Windows session by shutting down, rebooting or putting the computer into sleep or hibernation; clicking "Cancel" or pressing the Escape key returns the user to where they were.

The key combination always invokes Windows Security in all versions and editions of Windows NT family except Windows XP. (See below.) Prior to Windows Vista, Windows Security was a dialog box, did not allow user switching and showed the logon date and time, name of user account into which the user has logged on and the computer name. Starting with Windows Vista, Windows Security became full-screen.

Secure attention Login spoofing is a social engineering trick in which a malicious computer program with the appearance of a Windows login dialog box prompts for user's account name and password to steal them. To thwart this attack, Windows NT implements an optional security measure in which Ctrl+Alt+Delete acts as a secure attention key combination. Once the protection is activated, Windows requires the user to press Ctrl+Alt+Delete each time before logging on or unlocking the computer. Since the key combination is intercepted by Windows itself and malicious software cannot mimic this behavior, the trick is thwarted. Unless the Windows computer is part of a Windows domain network, the secure attention protection is disabled by default and must be enabled by the user.

Windows XP behavior Windows XP introduces Welcome Screen, a redesigned logon interface. The Welcome Screen of Windows XP, however, does not support the secure attention scenario. It may be disabled in favor of the classic plain logon screen, either explicitly by the user or as a consequence of the Windows XP computer becoming part of a Windows domain network. With that in mind, Windows XP uses the Ctrl+Alt+Delete in the following unique scenarios:
 At a logon prompt, the key combination dismisses Welcome Screen and invokes classic logon user interface.
 When a user is logged on to a Windows XP computer and Welcome Screen is enabled, pressing the key combination invokes Windows Task Manager instead of Windows Security.
Windows Vista and the next versions of Windows NT did not inherit any of the above.

OS/2 
In OS/2, this keystroke combination is recognized by the OS/2 keyboard device driver, which notifies the session manager process. The normal session manager process in OS/2 versions 2.0 and later is the parent Workplace Shell process, which displays the "system is rebooting" window and triggers a soft reboot. If it is pressed twice in succession OS/2 triggers an immediate soft reboot, without waiting for the session manager process.

In both cases, the system flushes the page cache, cleanly unmounts all disc volumes, but does not cleanly shut down any running programs (and thus does not save any unsaved documents, or the current arrangements of the objects on the Workplace Shell desktop or in any of its open folders).

Mac 
Ctrl+Alt+Delete is not a keyboard shortcut on macOS. Instead,  brings up the Force Quit panel.  restarts the computer.

The original Mac OS X Server had an Easter egg in which pressing  (as the Option key is the equivalent of Alt key on a Mac keyboard) would show an alert saying "This is not DOS!".

Linux 

On some Linux-based operating systems including Ubuntu and Debian,  is a shortcut for logging out.

On Ubuntu Server, it is used to reboot a computer without logging in.

Equivalents on various platforms

Cultural adoption 

As computers became ubiquitous, so too, has the jargon. Control-Alt-Delete can also mean "dump," or "do away with".

The keystrokes are well known and infamous for escaping from problems in pop culture. For example, in the Billy Talent song "Perfect World", part of the lyrics include the sequence and associate it with resetting their memory and escaping from a situation: "Control-Alt-Deleted. Reset my memory."

See also 
 Table of keyboard shortcuts

Notes

References

Further reading 

 Linux manual pages for kill(2) and reboot(2).

External links
David Bradley explaining how he invented Ctrl-Alt-Delete, at GreatBigStory. Archived at ghostarchive.org on 2022 May 24.

Windows administration
Computer keys
IBM PC compatibles
Linux administration
Operating system technology